Baileyton is a town in Cullman County, Alabama, United States. At the 2020 census, the population was 649.

The town's mayor is Johnny Dyar.

History
Baileyton was settled in 1870 by Robert Bailey, a farmer from Georgia. A post office was established in Baileyton in 1883. The town was incorporated in 1973.

Geography
Baileyton is located in northeastern Cullman County at  (34.267139, -86.603018).  The town lies northeast of the city of Cullman along State Route 69, with its municipal boundary reaching northeastward to State Route 67.  The town of Fairview lies just to the west along SR 69, and the Joppa community lies opposite SR 67 to the northeast.

Demographics

2000 Census data
As of the census of 2000, there were 684 people, 281 households, and 196 families in the town. The racial makeup of the town was 99.56% White, 0.29% Native American and 0.15% Asian.

Of the 281 households 32.0% had children under the age of 18 living with them, 56.6% were married couples living together, 8.2% had a female householder with no husband present, and 29.9% were non-families. 27.0% of households were one person and 11.4% were one person aged 65 or older. The average household size was 2.43 and the average family size was 2.93.

The age distribution was 26.6% under the age of 18, 6.1% from 18 to 24, 27.6% from 25 to 44, 26.0% from 45 to 64, and 13.6% 65 or older. The median age was 37 years. For every 100 females, there were 101.2 males. For every 100 females age 18 and over, there were 93.8 males.

The median household income was $31,000 and the median family income  was $41,563. Males had a median income of $30,083 versus $20,417 for females. The per capita income for the town was $14,696. About 10.3% of families and 16.6% of the population were below the poverty line, including 21.1% of those under age 18 and 22.5% of those age 65 or over.

2020 Census data

As of the 2020 United States census, there were 649 people, 325 households, and 226 families residing in the town.

References

External links

Baileyton - entry at the Encyclopedia of Alabama

Populated places established in 1870
Towns in Cullman County, Alabama
Towns in Alabama
1870 establishments in Alabama